Beef and the Banana (Swedish: Biffen och Bananen) is a 1951 Swedish comedy film directed by Rolf Husberg and starring Åke Grönberg, Åke Söderblom and Lillebil Kjellén. It was shot at the Råsunda Studios in Stockholm and on location in a variety of settings. The film's sets were designed by the art director Nils Svenwall.

It is an adaptation of the long-running comic strip of the same title by Jan-Erik Garland. It was followed by two sequels  Blondie, Beef and the Banana (1952) and Klarar Bananen Biffen? (1957), with the two leading actors reprising their roles.

Synopsis
Two men work with contrasting personalities work together in a bicycle factory. One is a meat-eater and the other a vegetation.

Cast
 Åke Grönberg as 	Biffen
 Åke Söderblom as 	Bananen
 Lillebil Kjellén as 	Kerstin Carve
 Lennart Lindberg as Stickan Berglund
 Håkan Westergren as Carlsson
 Gösta Prüzelius as 	Tage Wendel
 Maj Larsson as 	Ella Öhman
 Siv Larsson as 	Elsa Öhman
 Harriet Andersson as 	Girl
 Nils Hultgren as 	Teacher at Kalmar Slott
 Wiktor Andersson as 	Customer
 Yngve Lundh as 	Bicyclist
 Sven 'Svängis' Johansson as 	Bicyclist
 Nils 'Bagarn' Johansson as 	Bicyclist
 Rudolf E. Eklöw as 	Sports journalist 
 Jan-Erik Garland as Sports journalist 
 Raymond Maës as 	Swiss bicyclist 
 K.G. Norlén a s	Holm, supervisor 
 Bertil Perrolf as 	Radio reporter 
 Birgit Rogner as 	Maid 
 Oscar Söderlund as 	Sports journalist

References

Bibliography 
 Qvist, Per Olov & von Bagh, Peter. Guide to the Cinema of Sweden and Finland. Greenwood Publishing Group, 2000.
Segrave, Kerry & Martin, Linda.  The Continental Actress: European Film Stars of the Postwar Era--biographies, Criticism, Filmographies, Bibliographies. McFarland, 1990.

External links 
 

1951 films
Swedish comedy films
1951 comedy films
1950s Swedish-language films
Films directed by Rolf Husberg
1950s Swedish films
Films based on Swedish comics
Live-action films based on comics